Bhabendra Nath Bharali is an Asom Gana Parishad politician from Assam. He was elected in Assam Legislative Assembly election in 2016 from Dergaon constituency.

References 

Living people
Asom Gana Parishad politicians
People from Golaghat district
Assam MLAs 2016–2021
Year of birth missing (living people)
Assam MLAs 2021–2026